The School of Geodesy and Geomatics, Wuhan University is one of 27 schools in Wuhan University, Hubei province in China. Formerly the Wuhan Technical University of Surveying and Mapping, it was merged into Wuhan University in 2000.

Location
It is located at No.129 Luoyu Road, Hongshan District, Wuhan, Hubei Province.

History
The school was founded in 1956 as the Wuhan Institute of Surveying and Mapping. In 1958, the State Surveying and Mapping Bureau of China took charge of the college. In 1985, it was renamed as Wuhan Technical University of Surveying and Mapping. In 1993, the department of Geodesy and Engineering Survey was merged into the university and renamed it as School of Geoscience and Surveying Engineering of the university. In February 2000, the Ministry of Education of took charge of the university and merged it into Wuhan University as its School of Geodesy and Geomatics.

Image gallery

References

External links
Wuhan University School of Geodesy and Geomatics

Wuhan University
Geodesy organizations